Achref Gannouni (born 16 April 1997) is a Tunisian professional basketball player for Étoile Sportive du Sahel and the Tunisian national team.

He represented Tunisia at the FIBA AfroBasket 2021, where the team won the gold medal.

References

External links

1997 births
Living people
Guards (basketball)
Sportspeople from Tunis
Tunisian men's basketball players